This is a list of winners and nominees of the Primetime Emmy Award for Outstanding Contemporary Makeup (Non-Prosthetic) and Outstanding Period and/or Character Makeup (Non-Prosthetic). Before 2002, the category was called Outstanding Makeup for a Miniseries, Movie, or Special and included prosthetic and special effects makeup. Prior to 2020, awards were split between miniseries or movies and ongoing series.

In the following list, the first titles listed in gold are the winners; those not in gold are nominees, which are listed in alphabetical order. The years given are those in which the ceremonies took place:



Winners and nominations

1960s
Outstanding Individual Achievement in the Visual Arts (Makeup)

1970s
Outstanding Achievement in Makeup

1980s

1990s

2000s

2010s

2020s

Notes

Programs with multiple awards

5 awards
 Game of Thrones

3 awards
 The X-Files

2 awards
 American Horror Story
 Deadwood
 Euphoria
 Star Trek: Deep Space Nine
 Star Trek: The Next Generation
 The Tracey Ullman Show
 Westworld

Programs with multiple nominations

10 nominations
 American Horror Story

9 nominations
 Star Trek: The Next Generation

8 nominations
 Game of Thrones
 Mad Men

7 nominations
 Star Trek: Deep Space Nine

6 nominations
 CSI: Crime Scene Investigation

5 nominations
 Boardwalk Empire
 Glee
 The X-Files

4 nominations
 Alien Nation
 Babylon 5
 Beauty and the Beast
 Buffy the Vampire Slayer
 Deadwood
 Grey's Anatomy
 Nip/Tuck
 Star Trek: Voyager
 The Tracey Ullman Show

3 nominations
 American Crime Story
 Euphoria
 Fargo
 The Handmaid's Tale
 The Marvelous Mrs. Maisel
 Pose
 Tracey Takes On...
 Vikings

2 nominations
 Alias
 Amazing Stories
 Big Little Lies
 Carnivàle
 Dr. Quinn, Medicine Woman
 Genius
 GLOW
 Into the West
 The Knick
 Kung Fu
 Ozark
 Penny Dreadful
 The Politician
 Pushing Daisies
 Rome
 Sex and the City
 Six Feet Under
 Star Trek: Picard
 Stranger Things
 Tales from the Crypt
 This Is Us
 True Detective
 War and Remembrance
 Westworld

References

Outstanding Makeup (Non-Prosthetic)
Makeup awards
Awards established in 2020